XHMW-FM (102.3 MHz) is a Spanish Contemporary Music format radio station that serves the Laredo, Texas, United States and Nuevo Laredo, Tamaulipas, Mexico border area.

History
XHMW received its concession in March 1987. It was owned by Información Radiofónica, S.A., a Radiorama affiliate.

References

External links
 Radiorama Corporativo

Radio stations in Nuevo Laredo